Blue Lake (formerly, Scottsville) is a city in Humboldt County, California, United States. Its population is 1,208 as of the 2020 census, down from 1,253 from the 2010 census.

Geography and climate

History 
Present Blue Lake comprises "old" Blue Lake, Powersville, and Scottsville.  In 1854, Augusta Bates settled in the Scottsville area and sold to Brice M. Stokes in 1862.  In 1861, the 13-acre Blue Lake was formed from flooding of the north fork of Mad River, and it gave the town a resort atmosphere.  As the river changed course in the 1920s, the lake disappeared to become what today is a small pond on private property.

In 1866, William Scott purchased land from Brice M. Stokes and established "Scott's Farm," later becoming Scottsville. Powersville was established in 1869 by David Powers on land originally claimed by Augusta Bates, Brice M. Stokes and William Scott.

In 1876 a post office opened, named "Mad River."  The post office named Blue Lake was established in 1878.  The town of Blue Lake was incorporated on April 11, 1910.

Lumber industry

The lumber industry shipped wood down the Arcata and Mad River Railroad.  During the 1950s, timber shipped from Blue Lake included  from Levitt Brothers own lumberyard and nail factory from which lumber and nails were sent to the four Levittown developments in the eastern U.S.

Demographics

2010
At the 2010 census Blue Lake had a population of 1,253. The racial makeup of Blue Lake was 1,094 (87.3%) White, 5 (0.4%) African American, 55 (4.4%) Native American, 13 (1.0%) Asian, 4 (0.3%) Pacific Islander, 24 (1.9%) from other races, and 58 (4.6%) from two or more races. Hispanic or Latino of any race were 82 people (6.5%).

The whole population lived in households, no one lived in non-institutionalized group quarters and no one was institutionalized.

There were 542 households, 152 (28.0%) had children under the age of 18 living in them, 215 (39.7%) were opposite-sex married couples living together, 63 (11.6%) had a female householder with no husband present, 32 (5.9%) had a male householder with no wife present.  There were 45 (8.3%) unmarried opposite-sex partnerships, and 12 (2.2%) same-sex married couples or partnerships. 161 households (29.7%) were one person and 45 (8.3%) had someone living alone who was 65 or older. The average household size was 2.31.  There were 310 families (57.2% of households); the average family size was 2.79.

The age distribution was 248 people (19.8%) under the age of 18, 102 people (8.1%) aged 18 to 24, 361 people (28.8%) aged 25 to 44, 415 people (33.1%) aged 45 to 64, and 127 people (10.1%) who were 65 or older.  The median age was 38.3 years. For every 100 females, there were 95.8 males.  For every 100 females age 18 and over, there were 92.9 males.

There were 572 housing units at an average density of ,of which 542 were occupied, 301 (55.5%) by the owners and 241 (44.5%) by renters.  The homeowner vacancy rate was 1.0%; the rental vacancy rate was 2.8%.  712 people (56.8% of the population) lived in owner-occupied housing units and 541 people (43.2%) lived in rental housing units.

2000
At the 2000 census there were 1,135 people in 504 households, including 297 families, in the city. The racial makeup of the city was 88.72% White, 0.53% Black or African American, 5.37% Native American, 1.32% Asian, 0.09% Pacific Islander, 1.15% from other races, and 2.82% from two or more races.  2.47% of the population were Hispanic or Latino of any race.
Of the 504 households 27.4% had children under the age of 18 living with them, 41.9% were married couples living together, 13.7% had a female householder with no husband present, and 40.9% were non-families. 31.5% of households were one person and 9.3% were one person aged 65 or older.  The average household size was 2.25 and the average family size was 2.84.

The age distribution was 21.9% under the age of 18, 8.4% from 18 to 24, 29.6% from 25 to 44, 27.7% from 45 to 64, and 12.4% 65 or older.  The median age was 39 years. For every 100 females, there were 93.0 males.  For every 100 females age 18 and over, there were 86.9 males.

The median income for a household in the city was $32,500, and the median family income  was $37,500. Males had a median income of $35,924 versus $25,563 for females. The per capita income for the city was $17,603.  About 6.3% of families and 11.1% of the population were below the poverty line, including 13.0% of those under age 18 and 6.0% of those age 65 or over.

Politics

Notable people
Carlo Mazzone-Clementi, founder of Dell'Arte International School of Physical Theatre
Garth Iorg, American baseball player
Dane Iorg, American baseball player

References

External links

 

 
Incorporated cities and towns in California
Cities in Humboldt County, California